The Eyalet of Anatolia was one of the two core provinces (Rumelia being the other) in the early years of the Ottoman Empire. It was established in 1393. Its capital was first Ankara in central Anatolia, but then moved to Kütahya in western Anatolia.

The establishment of the province of Anatolia is held to have been in 1393, when Sultan Bayezid I ( 1389–1402) appointed Kara Timurtash as beylerbey and viceroy was in Anatolia, during Bayezid's absence on campaign in Europe against Mircea I of Wallachia. The province of Anatolia—initially termed beylerbeylik or generically vilayet ("province"), only after 1591 was the term eyalet used—was the second to be formed after the Rumelia Eyalet, and ranked accordingly in the hierarchy of the provinces. The first capital of the province was Ankara, but in the late 15th century it was moved to Kütahya.

As part of the Tanzimat reforms, the Anatolia Eyalet was dissolved  and divided into smaller provinces, although various scholars give conflicting dates for the dissolution, from as early as 1832 to as late as 1864.

Administrative divisions

References

Eyalets of the Ottoman Empire in Anatolia
States and territories established in 1393
States and territories disestablished in 1841
1393 establishments in the Ottoman Empire
1841 disestablishments in the Ottoman Empire